Mouilleron is a village in the Haute-Marne department, in France.

Mouilleron may also refer to:
 Mouilleron-en-Pareds, Vendée
 Mouilleron-le-Captif, Vendée